Mahamat Alhadj (born 11 August 1978) is a former Chadian professional football player. He made three appearances for the Chad national football team.

See also
 List of Chad international footballers

References

External links
 

1978 births
Living people
Chadian footballers
Chad international footballers
Place of birth missing (living people)
Association football midfielders